Ali Mech  was a tribal chief in the 13th century CE, in the region of present-day north of Bengal belonging to the Mech people.  He is said to have helped Bakhtiyar Khalji duing his Tibet campaign and converted to Islam under his influence.

Biography
Ali Mech is considered the first Muslim convert in present-day North Bengal. In the wake of Ali Mech's conversion to Islam, some Mech and Koch tribes also adopted the faith. The modern descendants of these converts are the Deshi people. 

As a tribal chief in the foothills of Kamrup, he aided Bakhtiyar Khilji in his failed invasion of Tibet in 1206 by acting as a guide.

E. A. Gait mentions that he guided Bakhtyar Khalji march northwards along the right bank of the Karatoya river (present-day Bangladesh) for ten days, through a country inhabited by the Koch, Mech and  Tharu (Terai) tribes.

Ali Mech supposedly bears a Muslim first name because he fond of Islam and embraced it. Soon hundreds of Mech inhabitants converted to Islam due to growing oppression in the hands of Hindu lords and its caste, customs and traditions and as most of them were considered to be Yavanas or polluted outsiders by the Aryan hindus.

References 

13th-century rulers in Asia
Islam in Assam
12th-century births
13th-century Indian Muslims
13th-century deaths
Converts to Islam